Vasilyovo is a rural locality (a village) in Posyolok Urshelsky, Gus-Khrustalny District, Vladimir Oblast, Russia. The population was 4 as of 2010.

Geography 
The village is located 10 km south-east from Urshelsky, 26 km west from Gus-Khrustalny.

References 

Rural localities in Gus-Khrustalny District